Gephyrellula is a monotypic genus of Brazilian running crab spiders containing the single species, Gephyrellula violacea. It was first described by Embrik Strand in 1932, and is only found in Brazil.

See also
 List of Philodromidae species

References

Monotypic Araneomorphae genera
Philodromidae
Spiders of Brazil
Taxa named by Embrik Strand